This is a list of the main career statistics of the professional Latvian tennis player Anastasija Sevastova.

Performance timelines

Only main-draw results in WTA Tour, Grand Slam tournaments, Fed Cup/Billie Jean King Cup and Olympic Games are included in win–loss records.

Singles
Current after the 2022 Australian Open.

Significant finals

Premier-Mandatory & Premier-5 tournaments

Singles: 1 (1 runner-up)

WTA career finals
Sevastova made her WTA Tour debut in 2007 and since then has won four singles titles. In singles, she also finished as runner-up at the Premier Mandatory China Open in 2018, where she lost to Caroline Wozniacki. In doubles, she reached one final, at the Mallorca Open in 2017, alongside Jelena Janković.

Singles: 8 (4 titles, 4 runner-ups)

Doubles: 1 (1 runner-up)

ITF Circuit finals
Sevastova made her debut at the ITF Women's Circuit in 2016, and since then has won 13 singles and 4 doubles titles.

Singles: 23 (13 titles, 10 runner–ups)

Doubles: 5 (4 titles, 1 runner–up)

WTA Tour career earnings
Current as of 15 November 2021

Career Grand Slam statistics

Grand Slam tournament seedings
The tournaments won by Sevastova are in boldface, and advanced into finals by Sevastova are in italics.

Best Grand Slam results details
Grand Slam winners are in boldface, and runner–ups are in italics.

Head-to-head record

Record against top 10 players
Sevastova's record against players who have been ranked in the top 10. Active players are in boldface.

Top 10 wins

Notes

References

Sevastova, Anastasija